ORG or org may refer to:

Music
 ORG Records, an independent record label active from 1986 to 2008

Organizations
 Organization (or organisation), a social entity that has a collective goal and is linked to an external environment
 Oxford Research Group, a UK-based charity which promotes a more sustainable approach to security
 Open Rights Group, a UK-based organization that works to preserve digital rights

Places
 Org, Minnesota, an unincorporated community in the United States
 Orange (Metrolink station), California, United States
 Zorg en Hoop Airport (IATA airport code "ORG"), the minor airport of Paramaribo, Suriname

File extensions (.org)
 Org-mode, an Emacs major mode for notes, planning, and authoring
 Lotus Organizer, personal organizer
 Origin (data analysis software), graphing software

Other uses
 .org, a generic top-level domain of the Domain Name System used in the Internet
 Oring language (ISO 639-3 language code "org")